Fairfield Bay is a city in Cleburne and Van Buren counties in the northern part of the U.S. state of Arkansas. The population was 2,108 at the 2020 census. The population in its portion in Van Buren County, which accounts for the bulk of the city limits, made the city the most populous in Van Buren County as of the 2000 census, but with a slight decline in population, lost the distinction to Clinton as of 2010.

Fairfield Bay, located on the shore of Greers Ferry Lake, is home to Fairfield Bay Resort, the namesake of Wyndham Worldwide-owned Fairfield Resorts.

Geography
It is located on hills overlooking the northern shore of Greers Ferry Lake, a reservoir on the Little Red River, a tributary of the White River which flows to the Mississippi.

Demographics

2020 census

As of the 2020 United States census, there were 2,108 people, 1,186 households, and 626 families residing in the city.

2000 census
As of the census of 2000, there were 2,460 people, 1,231 households, and 833 families residing in the city. The racial makeup of the city was 98.41% White, 0.53% Black or African American, 0.16% Native American, 0.24% Asian, and 0.65% from two or more races.  0.53% of the population were Hispanic or Latino of any race.

There were 1,231 households, out of which 8.9% had children under the age of 18 living with them, 62.0% were married couples living together, 4.3% had a female householder with no husband present, and 32.3% were non-families. 29.7% of all households were made up of individuals, and 21.9% had someone living alone who was 65 years of age or older.  The average household size was 1.91 and the average family size was 2.29.

In the city, the population was spread out, with 9.3% under the age of 18, 2.6% from 18 to 24, 10.2% from 25 to 44, 25.3% from 45 to 64, and 52.6% who were 65 years of age or older.  The median age was 66 years. For every 100 females, there were 82.4 males.  For every 100 females age 18 and over, there were 82.0 males.

The median income for a household in the city was $35,089, and the median income for a family was $42,419. Males had a median income of $30,337 versus $21,625 for females. The per capita income for the city was $24,900.  About 4.8% of families and 7.1% of the population were below the poverty line, including 20.1% of those under age 18 and 3.4% of those age 65 or over.

Education 
Public education for elementary and secondary students is provided by the Shirley School District in Van Buren County and by the West Side School District for Cleburne County.

References

External links
City of Fairfield Bay official website
Fairfield Bay Chamber of Commerce
Fairfield Bay News

Cities in Arkansas
Cities in Van Buren County, Arkansas
Cities in Cleburne County, Arkansas